The Bank of Lithuania is the central bank of the Republic of Lithuania. The Bank of Lithuania is a member of the European System of Central Banks. The chairman of the bank is Gediminas Šimkus. Until 2015, the Bank of Lithuania was responsible for managing the former Lithuanian national currency, the litas. It became a part of the Eurosystem when Lithuania adopted the euro on 1 January, 2015.

Primary functions

According to the Bank's official website, the Bank of Lithuania performs these primary functions:
 maintaining price stability,
 formulating and implementing the monetary policy,
 acting as an agent of the State Treasury.

Bank leadership 
Governors of the Bank of Lithuania:
Vladas Jurgutis (1922–1929)
Vladas Stašinskas (1930–1939)
Juozas Tūbelis (1939)
Juozas Paknys (1939–1940)

Chairmen of the board of the Bank of Lithuania:
Bronius Povilaitis (1990)
Vilius Baldišis (1990–1993)
Romualdas Visokavičius (1993)
Kazys Ratkevičius (1993–1996)
Reinoldijus Šarkinas (1996–2011)
Vitas Vasiliauskas (2011–2021)
Gediminas Šimkus (since 2021)

Management and structure

The Bank is governed by a board consisting of a chairperson, two deputy chairpersons and two members.

According to The Bank of Lithuania official website, it is managed by Supervision Service; ten departments: Economics, Statistics, Market Operations, International Relations, Payment Systems, Cash, Accounting, Information Technology, General Services and Security; six autonomous divisions (Internal Audit, Legal, Organisation and Personnel, General and Public Relations, Risk Management), and Bank of Lithuania Branches in Kaunas and Klaipėda.

See also
Economy of Lithuania
Lithuanian litas
Vladas Jurgutis Award

References

External links
 The Bank of Lithuania 

Lithuania
Lithuania
Banks of Lithuania
1922 establishments in Lithuania
Banks established in 1922
Companies based in Vilnius
Financial regulatory authorities of Lithuania